Chongshan Temple is a Buddhist temple located in Yingze District of Taiyuan, Shanxi. It is the headquarters of the Buddhist Association of Shanxi.

History

Tang dynasty
The original temple dates back to the Tang dynasty (618–907). It initially called "White Horse Temple" and later became "Yanshou Temple" and "Zongshan Temple". The current name dates to the Ming dynasty (1368–1644).

Ming dynasty
In 1381, in the 14th year of Hongwu period (1368–1398) in the Ming dynasty, Zhu Gang, the third son of Hongwu Emperor, expanded the temple on its ruins in memory of his mother.

Qing dynasty
In 1864, in the reign of Tongzhi Emperor (1862–1874) in the Qing dynasty (1644–1911), a disastrous fire destroyed most of its buildings with only the Hall of Great Compassion remaining.

In 1881, under the rule of Guangxu Emperor (1875–1908), Zhang Zhidong, the then provincial governor of Shanxi, established a Confucious temple on the ruins.

People's Republic of China
Chongshan Temple has been designated as a National Key Buddhist Temple in Han Chinese Area by the State Council of China in 1983.

On March 5, 2013, it was listed among the seventh batch of "Major National Historical and Cultural Sites in Shanxi" by the State Council of China.

Architecture

Now the existing main buildings include Shanmen, Bell tower, Drum tower, Mahavira Hall and Hall of Great Compassion.

Hall of Great Compassion
The Hall of Great Compassion is seven rooms wide and four rooms deep with double eaves gable and hip roofs. It still preserves the structural and architectural style in the Ming dynasty. In the middle of the hall placed the statue of Thousand-armed and eyed Guanyin with statues of Thousand-armed and bowls Manjusri and Samantabhadra stand on the left and right sides. The statues were made in the Hongwu period of the Ming dynasty.

National Treasures

Chinese guardian lions
A pair of Chinese guardian lions stands on both sides of the Shanmen. They were cast in 1391, in the 24th year of Hongwu period (1368–1398) in the Ming dynasty (1368–1644).

Ming dynasty bell
An iron bell hanging on the Bell tower. It was cast in 1506, in the Zhengde period (1506–1521) of the Ming dynasty (1368–1644).

References

Bibliography
 

Buddhist temples in Taiyuan
Buildings and structures in Taiyuan
Tourist attractions in Taiyuan
14th-century establishments in China
14th-century Buddhist temples
Religious buildings and structures completed in 1381